The Cyprus Institute of Marketing (CIM) was established in 1978 and is situated in Nicosia and Limassol.

It is registered with the Cyprus Ministry of Education  and is the first Business School to be established in Cyprus and among the older tertiary education providers in Cyprus. In addition to marketing, CIM offers programs in accounting and finance, HR, Shipping, and Law. It awards its own recognised Diplomas, Bachelors, and Masters. Its MBA was ranked 16th in Europe according to www.findyourMBA.com 

In 1984, a daughter school was opened in Limassol, the second largest city in Cyprus.

Affiliations
The Cyprus Institute of Marketing is Institutionally Approved by the University of West London (UK) and it offers three of the University of West London program in Cyprus, the BA (Hons) in Business Studies with Marketing, the BA (Hons) in Accounting & Finance and the MSc Digital Marketing, providing the opportunity to its students to acquire a UK University degrees while in Cyprus.

Recently the institute has been recognized as a Listed College by the Chartered Institute of Management Accountants (CIMA). Finally the Institute represents Cyprus in the European Marketing Confederation.

References

External links
Cyprus Institute of Marketing
Chartered Institute of Marketing
European Association for International Education - Members
Cyprus Ministry of Education and Culture - Listing
European University - Partners
http://www.findyourmba.com/fymba-rising-stars-2010

Universities and colleges in Cyprus
Nicosia
Educational institutions established in 1978
For-profit universities and colleges in Europe
1978 establishments in Cyprus